Dudu Karakaya-Koyuncu  (born November 11, 1985, in Kayseri, Turkey) is a Turkish middle distance runner competing in the 1500 m, 3000 m, 5000 m ,and 3000 m steeplechase events.

She began with athletics in secondary school years. Dudu Karakaya-Koyuncu graduated in physical education and sports from Erciyes University.

In 2009, Dudu Karakaya-Koyuncu became gold medalist in the 3000 m and 5000 m events of European Team Championships-First League held in Bergen, Norway. At the 2012 Balkan Athletics Indoor Championships held in Istanbul, she won the gold medal in 1500 m.

Karakaya qualified for participation in the 5000 m event at the 2012 Summer Olympics.

Achievements

References

External links

1985 births
Living people
People from Kayseri
Turkish female middle-distance runners
Turkish female steeplechase runners
Erciyes University alumni
Enkaspor athletes
Olympic athletes of Turkey
Athletes (track and field) at the 2012 Summer Olympics
21st-century Turkish sportswomen